Sar Kuhaki may refer to:
 Sar Kuhaki, Khuzestan
 Sar Kuhaki, Kohgiluyeh and Boyer-Ahmad